Soltanabad (also Romanized as Solţānābād) is a village in Tujerdi Rural District, Sarchehan District, Bavanat County, Fars Province, Iran. At the 2006 census, its population was 151, in 36 families.

References 

Populated places in Sarchehan County